was a Japanese businessman and philanthropist. He was born in Kurashiki, Okayama. He studied at Waseda University but left Waseda before graduation.　Later he became the most influential person in Kansai business community.

Founded
He founded Ōhara Art Museum, and the Kuraray chemical company.

Origins
He was a native of Kurashiki, Okayama.

Honours 
 the Medal with Dark Blue Ribbon (1920)
the 3rd class of the Order of the Sacred Treasure (1930)

See also
 Ōhara Art Museum

References

20th-century Japanese businesspeople
Japanese philanthropists
Japanese art collectors
Museum founders
People from Kurashiki
1880 births
1943 deaths